Radogost is, according to medieval chroniclers, the god of the Polabian Slavs, whose temple was located in Rethra. In modern scientific literature, however, the dominant view is that Radogost is a local nickname or a local alternative name of the solar god Svarozhits, who, according to earlier sources, was the chief god of Rethra. Some researchers also believe that the name of the town, where Svarozhits was the main deity, was mistakenly taken for a theonym. A popular local legend in the Czech Republic is related to Radogost.

Sources 

The first source mentioning this theonym is the Gesta Hammaburgensis ecclesiae pontificum by Adam of Bremen:
The elderly Bishop John, captured with other Christians in the city of Mecklenburg, was kept alive to be exhibited in triumph. And consequently, lashed with whips for having confessed to Christ, he was then paraded in each of the cities of the Slavs to be mocked, as he could not be forced to renounce the name of Christ, his hands and feet were cut off and his body was thrown into the street, but not before removing his head, which the pagans stuck on a pike and offered to their god Radogost as proof of victory. These events occurred in Rethra, the capital of the Slavs, the fourth day before the ides of November.
[...]
Among them, situated in the middle, are the extremely powerful Redarii, whose famous capital is Rethra, a seat of idolatry. There is a large temple built there, dedicated to the demons, whose prince is Radogost. His statue is made of gold, his baldachin bedecked with purple.

Following Adam, Radogost is also mentioned by Helmold in his Chronicle of the Slavs, who writes about making annual sacrifices to him and using an oracle associated with his temple, he also calls him "the god of the Obodrites". It is also mentioned in the Annales Augustani of 1135, which tells of the destruction of Rethra by Burchard II, Bishop of Halberstadt, who took the local "horse worshipped as a god" on which he returned to Saxony. The last source mentioning Radogost is the Passion of the Martyrs of Ebstorf.

Etymology and interpretations 

The first part of the name contains the adjective rad "glad" of uncertain further etymology, and the second part contains the noun gost "guest", from Proto-Indo-European *gʰostis (cf. Gothic  "guest",  "stranger"), and the name can be translated as "One who is ready to welcome a guest" or "The one who takes good care of guests". The name is ultimately derived from the Proto-Slavic given name *Radogostъ, cf. This name, expanded by the possessive suffix *-jь (*Radogostjь), formed many toponyms throughout Slavdom, cf.

Thietmar, in his Chronicle (written around 1018 r.) states that Svarozhits (recognized as a solar deity) was the most worshiped god in Polabian Radogošč. The same town, however mentioned under the name of Rethra, is also described about 50 years later by Adam of Bremen, who recognizes Redigast as the chief god of this city. As a result, it is generally believed that Radogost is another name for the Polabian Svarozhits, or that Radogost is a local sobriquet for Svarozhits. He is often mentioned as Rad(o)gost-Svarozhits, or Svarozhits/Radogost.

Some scholars, however, recognize that the name of the city was mistakenly assumed to be the chief deity of the city. Nikolay Zubov first points out that primary sources nowhere equate Svarozhits and Radogost. Moreover, the stem -rad appears in almost 150 anthroponyms, which makes this stem one of the most popular elements of names; the stem -gost is also a very popular component, which naturally results in the existence of names like Radogost or Gostirad. He also indicates that the Slavs originally did not give children divine names (as happened in ancient Greece), so the recognition of Radogost as a theonym would require the assumption of an exceptional situation. Aleksander Brückner also claimed that Adam made many mistakes.

Other propositions 
There were also attempts to combine the name Radogost with the name of the Gothic chief Radagaisus, but name Radagaisus has its own Gothic etymology. 18th-century authors, Karl Gottlob Anton and Anton Tomaž Linhart, regarded Radogost as "the god of joy or the generous happy foreigner," but the view of Radogost as an independent deity is considered unlikely. It is also unlikely that Radogost was a pseudo-deity. Some scholars have also suggested that the city was named after a deity, rather than the other way around. According to Gerard Labuda, the Latin Riedegost refers to an area surrounded by forest. He suggests reading the second segment as gozd "forest" and the whole name as "Forest of the Redarians", or also reading the first segment as redny "muddy, marshy" and the whole name as "Marshy, muddy forest".

In forgeries 

In the second half of the 19th century, so-called Prillwitz idols, which were supposed to depict Slavic deities, became popular. Nowadays, this find is considered an 18th century forgery. One of the statues is said to represent Radegast, and on the statue the name of the god is written using runes.

Radogost is also found in the glosses falsified by Václav Hanka in the 19th century in the Czech-Latin dictionary Mater Verborum.

Legend of Radhošť 

In the Czech Republic, there is a local legend associated with Saints Cyril and Methodius, according to which Radogost was worshipped on Radhošť. According to this legend, Cyril and Methodius decided to go on a Christianizing mission to the mountain. They set out to Radhošť from Velehrad through Zašová, where they baptized people. When they were approaching the mountain, they heard sounds of musical instruments and singing from the distance. When they reached the mountain, they saw pagan rituals led by prince Radoch. When the prince heard about the newcomers who were belittling the pagan gods, he began to rebuke Cyril and wanted to use force against him. At this point a glow appeared around the cross held by Cyril – Cyril began to speak of the "one true god" and the pagan gods as "an invention of hell". Then there was a noise and thunder and all the statues of the gods broke into a thousand pieces. Later, on the spot where the magnificent temple and idol of Radogost had stood, the saints erected a cross.

This legend is often found in publications about the mountain and, although the tale has been debunked many times, it often appeared, for example, in folklore. The legend first appears in 1710 in Sacra Moraviae historia sive Vita S. Cyrilli et Methodii by parish priest Jan Jiří Středovský. In the chapter dedicated to the name of the mountain and its origin, he refers to the testimony of a priest, according to whom a legend circulated among the people about a god of the same name, who stood on the top of the mountain and was overthrown by missionaries. On this basis, Středovský created a colourful story about a crowd of worshippers and pagan rituals on the mountain. There is also no archaeological or historiographical evidence that the heavily forested area on the mountain was inhabited in the past.

In culture 
 Radagast – wizard in Tolkien's legendarium
 Radegast – Czech beer brand
 Radegast – the statue of Radogost on Radhošť

References 
 Notes

 References

Bibliography 

 
 
 
 
 
 
 
 
 
 
 
 
 
 
 
 
 
 
 
 
 
 
 
 
 

 Dictionaries

Further reading
 
 .

External links
 

Slavic gods